John Park VC (February 1835 – 16 May 1863), born in Derry, Ireland, was an Irish recipient of the Victoria Cross, the highest and most prestigious award for gallantry in the face of the enemy that can be awarded to British and Commonwealth forces.

Details
Park was 19 years old, and a sergeant in the 77th Regiment (later The Middlesex Regiment – Duke of Cambridge's Own), British Army during the Crimean War when the following deeds took place for which he was awarded the Victoria Cross.

On 20 September and 5 November 1854 at the Battle of the Alma and Inkerman, Crimea, Sergeant Park showed great bravery. On 19 April 1855 Park also distinguished himself at the taking of the Russian Rifle Pits, during which he was severely wounded. He showed great resolution at both attacks on the Redan.

Park's citation reads:

Park died in Allahabad, India, on 16 May 1863, from sunstroke.

References

The Register of the Victoria Cross (1981, 1988 and 1997)

Ireland's VCs  (Dept of Economic Development, 1995)
Monuments to Courage (David Harvey, 1999)
Irish Winners of the Victoria Cross (Richard Doherty & David Truesdale, 2000)

External links
The Middlesex Regiment 1755–1966 (detailed history of the original "Die Hards")

1835 births
1863 deaths
19th-century Irish people
Irish soldiers in the British Army
Military personnel from Derry (city)
Crimean War recipients of the Victoria Cross
Irish recipients of the Victoria Cross
Middlesex Regiment soldiers
British Army personnel of the Crimean War
Deaths from hyperthermia
British Army recipients of the Victoria Cross